The 1948 California Golden Bears football team was an American football team that represented the University of California, Berkeley in the Pacific Coast Conference (PCC) during the 1948 college football season. In their second year under head coach Pappy Waldorf, the team compiled a 10–1 record (6–0 against PCC opponents), finished in a tie for the PCC championship, lost to Northwestern in the 1949 Rose Bowl, and outscored its opponents by a combined total of 291 to 100.

A controversial moment in the Rose Bowl game is now known as the "phantom touchdown," when Northwestern's player was given a touchdown even though he fumbled the ball as while he was crossing the line, California disputed the touchdown arguing that the ball was fumbled prior to its crossing the line. California's claim is supported by a photograph taken at that moment.

Schedule

References

California
California Golden Bears football seasons
Pac-12 Conference football champion seasons
California Golden Bears football